Boomerang is a 24-hour British pay television channel which primarily features classic and modern animated series from Hanna-Barbera and Warner Bros. Animation. The channel launched on 27 May 2000 as a spin-off of Cartoon Network and localisation of the original American network. It is run by Warner Bros. Discovery under its International division.

History

Origins
Boomerang UK began as a block in 1993, and was aired on Cartoon Network.

Launch
Boomerang launched on 27 May 2000, airing between 06:00–00:00, on Sky Digital and certain cable systems. At the time, Cartoon Network had a unique schedule and so the channel was created by Turner Broadcasting to broadcast classic cartoons from the Hanna-Barbera, MGM and Warner Bros. archive programme library, as well as freeing its sister network of many classics in the schedule.

In May 2001, Boomerang became the second highest-rated children's channel, beaten only by parent service Cartoon Network. In July of that year, the channel was added to on cable operator Telewest, thus increasing its viewership. James Greville, head of Cartoon Network UK at the time, stated, "The channel launched barely a year ago and yet it's already beaten established kids' channels in terms of ratings and share". By November, the channel was available on NTL.

Boomerang increased its library of old cartoons by acquiring rights to other animated shows such as Danger Mouse, The Pink Panther and Garfield and Friends. By the end of 2003, the channel decided to stay away from its former purpose and shifted to broadcast television movies and series.

A one-hour timeshift channel, Boomerang +1, launched on 6 March 2006.

Boomerang rebranded with the new international graphics package developed by UK based graphic design agency Art&Graft on 16 February 2015. The channel switched to 16:9 widescreen on 1 June 2015. A high-definition feed was launched on 24 June 2015.

On 3 September 2018, the channel was rebranded once again.

On 18 November 2020, Boomerang UK and Ireland were split into two regions following the move of the Bomerang Éire broadcasting licence to the Czech Republic. Boomerang Éire is managed by HBO Europe specifically targeting EU countries the Republic of Ireland, Malta and Gibraltar.

Availability

Cable
Virgin Media : Channel 730 (SD) and Channel 731 (+1)

Online
Now TV: Watch live

Satellite
Sky: Channel 603 (HD), Channel 611 (+1) and Channel 641 (SD)

Terrestrial
BT : Channel 467 (SD) and Channel 474 (HD)

Programming

Live-action programming
Between 23 July 2007 to 1 August 2009, the channel started airing live action programming, starting with Fraggle Rock (which also began airing on Cartoonito the same day).

Other live action series included Life with Derek, popular sitcom The Latest Buzz and the spy show My Spy Family.

Logos

References

External links
 

Children's television channels in the United Kingdom
Boomerang (TV network)
2000 establishments in the United Kingdom
Television channels and stations established in 2000
Turner Broadcasting System UK & Ireland